Bali Bhagat is a politician from Jammu and Kashmir. He is a former member of legislative assembly from Raipur-Domana constituency and a Former Minister of Government of Jammu and Kashmir and member of the BJP.

In 1996, he was elected from Doda district's (now Ramban) Ramban assembly constituency of J & K.He served as Minister for Forest, Social Welfare, Ecology & Environment in BJP-PDP Coalition government for 9 months. He also served as Health Minister in BJP-PDP Coalition government from  April 2016 to April 2018. He laid the foundation stone of Bone & Joint Hospital in Jammu Division as Bone & Joint Hospital in Kashmir has been established since 1980's. He is credited with the re-establishment of Govt. Ayurvedic College In Jammu Division after a gap of 40 years.

References

Living people
Bharatiya Janata Party politicians from Jammu and Kashmir
Jammu and Kashmir MLAs 1996–2002
People from Ramban district
Year of birth missing (living people)
Jammu and Kashmir MLAs 2014–2018
State cabinet ministers of Jammu and Kashmir